Yoan Cardinale (born 27 March 1994) is a French professional footballer who plays as a goalkeeper for SC Toulon.

Career
Cardinale is a youth product of Nice. He made his Ligue 1 debut on 18 October 2015 against Rennes, playing the full game.He played for Ligue 1 club Nice until the end of the 2020–21 season.

On 24 August 2022, Cardinale joined SC Toulon on a free transfer, after a year without a club.

Career statistics

References

External links
 
 

1994 births
Living people
French footballers
French people of Corsican descent
Association football goalkeepers
Ligue 1 players
OGC Nice players
People from La Ciotat
Sportspeople from Bouches-du-Rhône
Footballers from Provence-Alpes-Côte d'Azur